The Argentina women's national under-20 football team is the representative of Argentina in FIFA sponsored tournaments that pertain to that age level.
They have participated in the eight editions of the South American U-20 Women's Championship, their best result finishing runners-up in 2006, 2008 and 2012, which allowed them to qualify for the FIFA U-20 Women's World Cup in 2006, 2008 and 2012, although in all of them, they ended up being eliminated in the group stage.

Results and fixtures

The following is a list of recent match results, as well as any future matches that have been scheduled.
Legend

Players

Current squad
The following players were called up for the xxxx tournament on 9 September 2021.

Caps and goals accurate up to and including 9 September 2021.

Competitive record
 Champions   Runners-up   Third place   Fourth place

FIFA U-20 Women's World Cup

South American U-20 Women's Championship

See also
Sport in Argentina
Football in Argentina
Women's football in Argentina
Argentina women's national football team
Argentina women's national under-17 football team
Argentina–Brazil football rivalry

References

Argentina women's national football team
Youth football in Argentina
South American women's national under-20 association football teams